The numismatic series Wealth and Pride of Peru ("Riqueza y Orgullo del Perú" in Spanish) were minted by the Central Reserve Bank of Peru with the aim of promoting a numismatic culture and disseminate the cultural heritage of Peru. Each coin depicts a department of Peru, showing a tourist attraction in the region.

All coins in the series have the denomination of One Nuevo Sol/Sol and are legal tender throughout the country. Ten million units of each of the following coins have been minted:

See also 
 Peruvian sol
 Numismatic series Natural Resources of Peru

References

External links 
 Numismatic Series "Wealth and Pride of Peru" in limaeasy.com

Coins of Peru